The Whistler Group is an electronics company based in Bentonville, Arkansas, and is best known for its radar detectors.  Whistler also manufactures power inverters, GPS navigation devices, inspection cameras, LED flashlights, vehicle dashboard cameras, and scanner radios.

Scanner Radios
In late 2013 Whister Group acquired the scanner radio technical assets from GRE who closed their factory in 2012. In early 2014 Whister began manufacturing scanner radios very similar to those produced by GRE. Whistler manufactured scanners for Radio Shack.

References

Electronics companies of the United States